Otto Feige  (21 September 1882 in Nysa - 2 January 1951 in Kaufbeuren) was an Admiral of the German Kriegsmarine (War Navy) during World War II. He had initially served in the Kaiserliche Marine (Imperial Navy) of the German Empire. He was born in Neisse in Silesia on 21 September 1882.

In 1940, then-Konteradmiral (Rear Admiral) Feige was placed in command of the operation to transfer the unfinished  to the Soviet Union. The Kriegsmarine provided an escort of destroyers and other vessels to protect the ship from Allied attack. Upon arrival, Feige led an advisory team that was to help the Soviets complete the ship, though the ship, which had been renamed Petropavlovsk, was still under construction when Germany invaded the Soviet Union in June 1941. In anticipation of Germany's impending attack, Feige had helped to delay the transfer of materials from Germany to complete the ship.

Footnotes

References
 
 
 

1882 births
1951 deaths
Imperial German Navy personnel of World War I
People from Nysa, Poland
Kriegsmarine personnel of World War II
Kriegsmarine admirals